Umberto Riva (16 June 1928 – 25 June 2021) was an Italian architect, designer and painter.

Further reading

References

1928 births
2021 deaths
Architects from Milan
Architects from Palermo
Italian designers
Painters from Milan
Painters from Palermo
20th-century Italian architects
21st-century Italian architects
20th-century Italian painters
21st-century Italian painters